Joe Edward Cummings (born June 8, 1974) is a former American football linebacker in the National Football League. He played college football at Wyoming.

Early life and high school
Cummings was born in Missoula, Montana and grew up in Stevensville, Montana. He attended Stevensville High School and was named the Montana Gatorade Player of the Year as a senior.

College career
Cummings was a three year starter for the Wyoming Cowboys. As a senior, he recorded eight sacks and 10 tackles for loss and was named first-team All-Western Athletic Conference.

Professional career
Following the 1996 NFL Draft, Cummings was signed by the Philadelphia Eagles as an undrafted free agent on April 26, 1996 but was cut during training camp. He was later signed by the San Diego Chargers and played in three games for the team. He was a member of the Green Bay Packers in 1997 during the off season but was cut at the end of training camp. Cummings signed with the Buffalo Bills, who allocated him to the Barcelona Dragons and then spent the 1998 and 1999 seasons with the team. Cummings also played for the Orlando Rage of the XFL in 2001.

Personal life
Cummings father, Ed Cummings, played linebacker in the American Football League for the New York Jets and Denver Broncos.

References

1974 births
Living people
American football linebackers
Wyoming Cowboys football players
San Diego Chargers players
Buffalo Bills players
Players of American football from Montana
Sportspeople from Missoula, Montana
Philadelphia Eagles players
Green Bay Packers players
Barcelona Dragons players
Orlando Rage players